The Valigonda rail disaster occurred on 29 October 2005 near the town of Valigonda, south of Hyderabad in the Indian state of Andhra Pradesh.  A flash flood swept away a small rail bridge, and a "Delta Fast Passenger" train traveling on it derailed at the broken section of the line, killing at least 114 people and injuring over 200.

Accident details
The train was traveling south at night, packed with hundreds of sleeping holiday makers visiting relatives for Diwali, when a huge irrigation tank situated upstream from the rail lines ruptured, sending thousands of gallons of water down the channel, destroying the bridge in the darkness.  When the passenger train hit the broken section a short time later, nobody had reported the damage, and the engine and seven coaches of the train disappeared into the gap created by the broken line.  Four coaches crashed into a field close to where the track had been, whilst three more fell into the channel and were swept farther afield into deeper water, where most of the fatalities occurred.

In the day following the accident, the Indian Navy supplied divers, who dove into the flood waters with blow torches to try to rescue people who might have been trapped in air pockets in the sunken carriages.  Reportedly, several people were rescued this way. The Indian Army and Air Force also provided assistance with rescue, medical and heavy lift helicopters, by collecting bodies and maintaining security at the site.

The area had been lashed by monsoon rains for several weeks before the accident, which had waterlogged fields and over-filled the irrigation tank, which had ruptured due to unknown factors exacerbated by the heavy volume of rainfall.  The flooding had also destroyed several roads, hampering efforts to get emergency personnel to the scene quickly.  India's Junior Transport Minister commented that "little could have been done to avoid the accident".

Similar accidents 
  24 December 1953 – Tangiwai disaster – Tangiwai, North Island, New Zealand: the Tangiwai railway bridge over the Whangaehu River collapsed as the overnight express train between Wellington and Auckland passed over it; the bridge supports had been weakened by a lahar a few minutes before the train passed. 151 people were killed. A passerby was not able to warn the train in time.  The rebuilt bridge is equipped with high water warning devices.
  1880 – Murrurundi – night mail train derailed at a washaway – 10 killed.
  25 January 1885 – Salt Creek near Cootamundra – night mail train derailed at a washaway – 7 killed.
  7 August 1904 – Eden, Colorado, United States: Train caught in bridge washout; 97 known dead; 14 missing.
  27 September 1923 – near Glenrock, Wyoming – a bridge over Coal Creek was washed away and a passenger train derailed, killing 30 of the train's 66 passengers. 
  8 September 1945 – Llangollen, Denbighshire, Wales: An early morning mail train crashes after the adjacent canal flooded and washed away the track at Sun Bank, killing the driver and causing a fire. 
  1993 – 114 perished in a passenger train which plunged into a river after floods washed away a bridge at Ngai Ndethya.

See also 
 List of rail accidents (2000–present)

References

External links

BBC News Report
Photograph of the wreckage
USA Today News Report
Russian News Report
Guardian News Report

2005 disasters in India
Railway accidents in 2005
2005 in India
Rail transport in Andhra Pradesh
Railway accidents and incidents in Andhra Pradesh
Derailments in India
Bridge disasters in India
Bridge disasters caused by scour damage